There are at least 16 large and 45 small mammal species known to occur in Grand Teton National Park, an American national park in northwestern Wyoming. Species are listed by common name, scientific name, and relative abundance.

Legend
 a – Abundant – likely to be seen in appropriate habitat and season
 c – Common – frequently seen in appropriate habitat and season
 u – Uncommon – seen irregularly in appropriate habitat and season
 r – Rare – unexpected even in appropriate habitat and season
 x – Accidental – out of known range, or reported only once or twice

Large mammals

Bears

Order: Carnivora, Family: Ursidae
 Black bear, Ursus americanus, c
Brown bear, Ursus arctos u
Grizzly bear, U. a. horribilis, u

Canines
Order: Carnivora, Family: Canidae
 Coyote, Canis latrans, a
 Gray wolf, Canis lupus u
Northwestern wolf, C. l. occidentalis, u
 Red fox, Vulpes vulpes, r

Felines

Order: Carnivora, Family: Felidae
 Canada lynx, Lynx canadensis, r
 Bobcat, Lynx rufus, r
 Cougar, Puma concolor, r

Deer
Order: Artiodactyla, Family: Cervidae
 Moose, Alces alces, a
 Elk (wapiti), Cervus canadensis, a
 Mule deer, Odocoileus hemionus, c
 White-tailed deer, Odocoileus virginianus, r

Pronghorn
Order: Artiodactyla, Family: Antilocapridae
 Pronghorn, Antilocapra americana, c

Cattle

Order: Artiodactyla, Family: Bovidae
 Bison, Bison bison, c
 Mountain goat, Oreamnos americanus, x
 Bighorn sheep, Ovis canadensis, u

Small mammals

Raccoons
Order: Carnivora, Family: Procyonidae
Raccoon, Procyon lotor, r

Badgers and weasels

Order: Carnivora, Family: Mustelidae
Wolverine, Gulo gulo, alpine, r
North American river otter, Lontra canadensis, c
Pacific marten, Martes caurina, c
Least weasel, Mustela nivalis, r
Short-tailed weasel, Mustela richardsonii, u
Long-tailed weasel, Neogale frenata, c
American mink, Neogale vison, riparian forests, u
American badger, Taxidea taxus, c

Skunks
Order: Carnivora, Family: Mephitidae
Striped skunk, Mephitis mephitis, u

Hares and rabbits

Order: Lagomorpha, Family: Leporidae
Snowshoe hare, Lepus americanus, c
White-tailed jackrabbit, Lepus townsendii, u

Pikas
Order: Lagomorpha, Family: Ochotonidae
American pika, Ochotona princeps, c

Shrews

Order: Soricomorpha, Family: Soricidae
 Masked shrew, Sorex cinereus, c
 Dwarf shrew, Sorex nanus, r
 American water shrew, Sorex palustris, u
 Vagrant shrew, Sorex vagrans, c

Beaver
Order: Rodentia, Family: Castoridae
 Beaver, Castor canadensis, a

Squirrels

Order: Rodentia, Family: Sciuridae
 Least chipmunk, Tamias minimus, a
 Uinta chipmunk, Tamias umbrinus, u
 Yellow-pine chipmunk, Tamias amoenus, c
 Yellow-bellied marmot, Marmota flaviventris, c
 Golden-mantled ground squirrel, Spermophilus lateralis, c
 Northern flying squirrel, Glaucomys sabrinus, u
 American red squirrel, Tamiasciurus hudsonicus, a
 Uinta ground squirrel, Spermophilus armatus, a

Pocket gophers
Order: Rodentia, Family: Geomyidae
 Northern pocket gopher, Thomomys talpoides, u

Mice

Order: Rodentia, Family: Cricetidae
 Deer mouse, Peromyscus maniculatus, a

Jumping mice
Order: Rodentia, Family: Dipodidae
 Western jumping mouse, Zapus princeps, c

Muskrats, voles and woodrats

Order: Rodentia, Family: Cricetidae
 Muskrat, Ondatra zibethicus, c
 Western heather vole, Phenacomys intermedius, c
 Long-tailed vole, Microtus longicaudus, u
 Meadow vole, Microtus pennsylvanicus, a
 Montane vole, Microtus montanus, a
 Sagebrush vole, Lemmiscus curtatus, r
 Southern red-backed vole, Myodes gapperi, c
 Water vole, Microtus richardsoni, c
 Bushy-tailed woodrat, Neotoma cinerea, u

Porcupines
Order: Rodentia, Family: Erethizontidae
 North American porcupine, Erethizon dorsatum, c

Bats

Order: Chiroptera, Family: Vespertilionidae
 Big brown bat, Eptesicus fuscus, u
 Hoary bat, Lasiurus cinereus, u
 Little brown bat, Myotis lucifugus, c
 Long-eared bat, Myotis evotis, u
 Long-legged bat, Myotis volans, u
 Silver-haired bat, Lasionycteris noctivagans, u

Further reading

See also
 Animals of Yellowstone
 Small mammals of Yellowstone National Park

Notes

Mammals
Mammals
Mammals
Grand Teton